AAAD may refer to:

 Academy of Arts, Architecture and Design in Prague
 Aromatic L-amino acid decarboxylase
 All-arms Air Defence, a component of part of Anti-aircraft warfare